FC Pakhtakor Tashkent is an Uzbek professional football club, based in the capital city Tashkent, that competes in the Uzbekistan Super League. Pakhtakor literally means "cotton-grower" in English.

Pakhtakor was the only Uzbek club to play in the top-level Soviet football league and was the only Central Asian club to appear in a Soviet Cup final. Playing in the Uzbek League since 1992, the club has been the undisputed powerhouse in Uzbekistan since the fall of the Soviet Union, winning fourteen Uzbek League titles, including six in a row from 2002 to 2007. Pakhtakor also won seven consecutive domestic cups between 2001 and 2007, winning eleven cups in total. Players for the club have won Uzbek footballer of the Year honours eight times, and Pakhtakor teammates swept the top three spots in 2002. Club managers have been named Uzbek coach of the year twice.

The team is also a perennial competitor in the AFC Champions League, having reached the semi-finals of the competition twice in 2003 and 2004. Pakhtakor currently holds the record in number of consecutive participations in the AFC Champions League, participating in 11 tournaments from 2002 to 2013.

Name
The word Pakhta (پخته) in Persian means cotton and "kor" (کار) is from verb  کاشتن, ( kâshtan (Iranian Persian pronunciation), koshtan, kishtan (Tajik Persian pronunciation) ) which means "to cultivate"; so the combination "Pakhtakor" produces a job name and literally means "cotton maker".

History

The early Soviet period
Pakhtakor's first official match was on 8 April 1956, date considered to be the club's "birthday". Its first match was played against a team from the city of Perm, Russia (then called Molotov city), presumably FC Zvezda Perm.  The first goal in Pakhtakor history was scored by Laziz Maksudov on a penalty shot and Maksudov's goal was the only and game-winning strike.

The team was formed in three months, and the government invited the senior trainer Valentin Bekhtenev from Moscow to recruit the best Tashkent players for the new Pakhtakor.  At the time, the club was to represent Uzbekistan in Soviet football.

In 1959, the club was promoted to the Soviet Top League for the first time.  During the 1960s, Pakhtakor's squad was anchored by the striker Gennadiy Krasnitskiy, who led it to a 6th-place finish in 1962.  After periods back and forth between the Top League and the Soviet First League, the club reached the final of the Soviet Cup competition in 1968 – the only Central Asian club to reach a Soviet Cup final – losing to Torpedo Moscow 1–0.

In 1971, Pakhtakor again departed from the First League, but was not long detained in the lower division as it gained promotion the following year.

Pakhtakor was the only Uzbek side to appear in the history of the USSR Championship during the Soviet era, appearing the highest echelon 22 times, and recording 212 wins, 211 draws, and 299 losses.  Their best league finish was 6th place, which they achieved twice, in 1962 and 1982.

Aircrash 1979

In August 1979, Pakhtakor made it back to the Soviet Top League, but shortly thereafter disaster struck the club and Soviet football.  During a flight to play Dinamo Minsk, Pakhtakor's plane was involved in a mid-air collision over Dniprodzerzhynsk, Ukrainian SSR. All 178 people aboard both planes involved died.

Seventeen Pakhtakor players and staff members died in the crash:
Idgay Borisovich Tazetdinov (Trainer), (13.01.1933)
Mikhail Ivanovich An (Half-back), (19.11.1952)
Vladimir Ivanovich Fedorov (Forward), (05.01.1956)
Alim Masalievich Ashirov (Defender), (25.01.1955)
Ravil Rustamovich Agishev (Defender), (14.03.1959)
Constantine Alexandrovich Bakanov (Half-back), (25.05.1954)
Yuri Timofeevich Zagumennykh (Defender), (07.06.1947)
Alexander Ivanovich Korchenov (Half-back), (04.05.1949)
Nikolai Borisovich Kulikov (Defender), (25.04.1953)
Vladimir Vasilyevich Makarov (Half-back), (09.03.1947)
Sergey Constantinovich Pokatilov (Goalkeeper), (20.12.1950)
Victor Nikolayevich Churkin (Forward), (25.01.1952)
Sirozhiddin Akhmedovich Bazarov (Forward), (10.08.1961)
Shukhrat Musinovich Ishbutaev (Forward), (08.02.1959)
Vladimir Valievich Sabirov (Forward), (14.01.1958)
Vladimir Vasilyevich Chumaks (Manager), (08.12.1932)
Mansur Inamdzhanovich Talibdzhanov (Club administrator), (04.04.1944)

Annually, in August, the club sponsors a youth tournament in memory of the people lost in the disaster.

Following the tragedy in 1979 and spurred on by its prolific goalscorer Andrei Yakubik a few years later, Pakhtakor had its best record in 1982, finishing sixth and in front of several Russian and Ukrainian football powerhouses such as Zenit Saint Petersburg, CSKA Moscow, and Shakhtar Donetsk amongst the few. Pakhtakor had a point deducted that season due to exceeding the allowed limit for the games tied (drawn), but it did not influence the club's final standings.

The lean years: 1984–1990
After leading Pakhtakor to its best finish, age finally caught up with Yakubik and he moved back to his hometown of Moscow to continue his football career. With the departure of their great forward, the club struggled and spent six years in the Soviet First League.  Although the discontent of their fans grew, Pakhtakor's reemergence as a major footballing force followed fast upon the dissolution of the Soviet Union.

Modern period, since 1992

After the USSR collapsed, a new page began in the club's history. 1992 saw Pakhtakor participate in the first season of the Uzbek Oliy League. Since 1992 Pakhtakor have become the most successful Uzbek club with 10 Uzbek League titles, and 11 Uzbek Cups. Until 2014 the club is the only team to have participated in all seasons of the AFC Champions League since its inauguration in 2002. Since 2002 the club participated 11 times in AFC Champions League.

The participation in the AFC Champions League season 2011 was not successful. On 4 May 2011 in a match against Al-Nassr Pakhtakor lost and finished its Asian campaign. In that match, because of many injured players, Pakhtakor's coach Ravshan Khaydarov formed a starting squad from the youth team players and so the club made a record in the AFC Champions League history as the youngest team of the tournament with average players age of 21,8. The average age of club players for season 2011 was 23,3. In the 2014–15 seasons, Pakhtakor won its 10th and 11th League champion titles.

Competitions

Domestic record

Continental record

{| class="wikitable mw-collapsible mw-collapsed" align=center cellspacing="0" cellpadding="3" style="border:1px solid #AAAAAA;font-size:90%"
|-
! Season
! Competition
! Round
! Club
! Home
! Away
! Aggregate
|-
|rowspan="4"|1994–95
|rowspan="4"|Asian Cup Winners' Cup
|rowspan="4"|Preliminary round
| Ravshan Kulob
| colspan=3; style="text-align:center;"|10–0
|-
| Taraz
| colspan=3; style="text-align:center;"|0–3
|-
| Alay-Osh-Pirim
| colspan=3; style="text-align:center;"|5–1
|-
| Merw
| colspan=3; style="text-align:center;"|4–0
|-
|rowspan="3"|1998–99
|rowspan="3"|Asian Cup Winners' Cup
|rowspan="1"|First round
| Khujand
|style="text-align:center;"|4–1
|style="text-align:center;"|1–1
|style="text-align:center;"|5–2
|-
|rowspan="1"|Second round
| Nisa Aşgabat
|style="text-align:center;"|6–0
|style="text-align:center;"|0–5
|style="text-align:center;"|6–5
|-
|rowspan="1"|Third round
| Al-Ittihad
|style="text-align:center;"|0–1
|style="text-align:center;"|0–3
|style="text-align:center;"|0–4
|-
|rowspan="1"|1999–2000
|rowspan="1"|Asian Club Championship
|rowspan="1"|First round
| Irtysh Pavlodar
|style="text-align:center;"|5–2
|style="text-align:center;"|0–7
|style="text-align:center;"|5–9
|-
|rowspan="2"|2001–02
|rowspan="2"|Asian Cup Winners' Cup
|rowspan="1"|First round
| SKA-PVO Bishkek
|style="text-align:center;"|3–1
|style="text-align:center;"|1–2
|style="text-align:center;"|4–3
|-
|rowspan="1"|Second round
| Regar-TadAZ Tursunzoda
|style="text-align:center;"|2–2
|style="text-align:center;"|1–3
|style="text-align:center;"|3–5
|-
|rowspan="4"|2002–03
|rowspan="4"|AFC Champions League
|rowspan="3"|Group stage
| Persepolis
| colspan=2; style="text-align:center;"|1–0
| rowspan=3; style="text-align:center;"|1st
|-
| Al-Talaba
| colspan=2; style="text-align:center;"|3–0
|-
| Nisa Aşgabat
| colspan=2; style="text-align:center;"|3–0
|-
|rowspan="1"|Semi-final
| BEC Tero Sasana
| style="text-align:center;"|1–0
| style="text-align:center;"|1–3
| style="text-align:center;"|2–3
|-
|rowspan="5"|2004
|rowspan="5"|AFC Champions League
|rowspan="3"|Group stage
| Zob Ahan
| style="text-align:center;"|2–0
| style="text-align:center;"|0–1
| rowspan=3; style="text-align:center;"|1st
|-
| Qatar
| style="text-align:center;"|1–0
| style="text-align:center;"|0–0
|-
| Riffa
| style="text-align:center;"|w/o
| style="text-align:center;"|w/o
|-
|rowspan="1"|Quarter-final
| Al Wahda
| style="text-align:center;"|4–0
| style="text-align:center;"|1–1
| style="text-align:center;"|5–1
|-
|rowspan="1"|Semi-final
| Seongnam
| style="text-align:center;"|0–0
| style="text-align:center;"|0–2
| style="text-align:center;"|0–2
|-
|rowspan="3"|2005
|rowspan="3"|AFC Champions League
|rowspan="3"|Group stage
| Al-Ahli
| style="text-align:center;"|2–1
| style="text-align:center;"|0–3
| rowspan=3; style="text-align:center;"|2nd
|-
| Al-Zawra'a
| style="text-align:center;"|1–2
| style="text-align:center;"|0–1
|-
| Al-Jaish
| style="text-align:center;"|4–1
| style="text-align:center;"|2–0
|-
|rowspan="3"|2006
|rowspan="3"|AFC Champions League
|rowspan="3"|Group stage
| Qadsia
| style="text-align:center;"|2–2
| style="text-align:center;"|1–2
| rowspan=3; style="text-align:center;"|2nd
|-
| Foolad
| style="text-align:center;"|2–0
| style="text-align:center;"|3–1
|-
| Al-Ittihad
| style="text-align:center;"|2–0
| style="text-align:center;"|1–2
|-
|rowspan="3"|2007
|rowspan="3"|AFC Champions League
|rowspan="3"|Group stage
| Al-Hilal
| style="text-align:center;"|0–2
| style="text-align:center;"|0–2
| rowspan=3; style="text-align:center;"|2nd
|-
| Kuwait
| style="text-align:center;"|2–1
| style="text-align:center;"|1–0
|-
| Esteghlal
| style="text-align:center;"|w/o
| style="text-align:center;"|w/o
|-
|rowspan="3"|2008
|rowspan="3"|AFC Champions League
|rowspan="3"|Group stage
| Qadsia
| style="text-align:center;"|0–1
| style="text-align:center;"|2–2
| rowspan=3; style="text-align:center;"|2nd
|-
| Erbil
| style="text-align:center;"|2–0
| style="text-align:center;"|5–1
|-
| Al-Gharafa
| style="text-align:center;"|2–0
| style="text-align:center;"|2–2
|-
|rowspan="5"|2009
|rowspan="5"|AFC Champions League
|rowspan="3"|Group stage
| Al-Hilal
| style="text-align:center;"|1–1
| style="text-align:center;"|0–2
| rowspan=3; style="text-align:center;"|2nd
|-
| Saba Qom
| style="text-align:center;"|2–1
| style="text-align:center;"|2–0
|-
| Al-Ahli
| style="text-align:center;"|2–0
| style="text-align:center;"|2–1
|-
|rowspan="1"|Round of 16
| Ettifaq
| colspan=3; style="text-align:center;"|2–1
|-
|rowspan="1"|Quarter-final
| Al-Ittihad
| style="text-align:center;"|1–1
| style="text-align:center;"|0–4
| style="text-align:center;"|1–5
|-
|rowspan="4"|2010
|rowspan="4"|AFC Champions League
|rowspan="3"|Group stage
| Al-Shabab
| style="text-align:center;"|1–3
| style="text-align:center;"|1–2
| rowspan=3; style="text-align:center;"|2nd
|-
| Sepahan
| style="text-align:center;"|2–1
| style="text-align:center;"|0–2
|-
| Al Ain
| style="text-align:center;"|3–2
| style="text-align:center;"|1–0
|-
|rowspan="1"|Round of 16
| Al-Gharafa
| colspan=3; style="text-align:center;"|0–1
|-
|rowspan="3"|2011
|rowspan="3"|AFC Champions League
|rowspan="3"|Group stage
| Al Sadd
| style="text-align:center;"|1–1
| style="text-align:center;"|1–2
| rowspan=3; style="text-align:center;"|4th
|-
| Al-Nassr
| style="text-align:center;"|2–2
| style="text-align:center;"|0–4
|-
| Esteghlal
| style="text-align:center;"|2–1
| style="text-align:center;"|2–4
|-
|rowspan="3"|2012
|rowspan="3"|AFC Champions League
|rowspan="3"|Group stage
| Al-Ittihad
| style="text-align:center;"|1–2
| style="text-align:center;"|0–4
| rowspan=3; style="text-align:center;"|3rd
|-
| Baniyas
| style="text-align:center;"|1–1
| style="text-align:center;"|0–2
|-
| Al-Arabi
| style="text-align:center;"|3–1
| style="text-align:center;"|1–0
|-
|rowspan="3"|2013
|rowspan="3"|AFC Champions League
|rowspan="3"|Group stage
| Lekhwiya
| style="text-align:center;"|2–2
| style="text-align:center;"|1–3
| rowspan=3; style="text-align:center;"|4th
|-
| Al Shabab
| style="text-align:center;"|1–2
| style="text-align:center;"|1–0
|-
| Ettifaq
| style="text-align:center;"|1–0
| style="text-align:center;"|0–2
|-
|rowspan="3"|2015
|rowspan="3"|AFC Champions League
|rowspan="3"|Group stage
| Al Ain
| style="text-align:center;"|0–1
| style="text-align:center;"|1–1
| rowspan=3; style="text-align:center;"|3rd
|-
| Naft Tehran
| style="text-align:center;"|2–1
| style="text-align:center;"|1–1
|-
| Al-Shabab
| style="text-align:center;"|0–2
| style="text-align:center;"|2–2
|-
|rowspan="3"|2016
|rowspan="3"|AFC Champions League
|rowspan="3"|Group stage
|  Al-Hilal 
| style="text-align:center;"|2–2
| style="text-align:center;"|1–4
| rowspan=3; style="text-align:center;"|3rd
|-
|  Tractor Sazi
| style="text-align:center;"|1–0
| style="text-align:center;"|0–2
|-
|  Al Jazira 
| style="text-align:center;"|3–0
| style="text-align:center;"|3–1
|-
|rowspan="1"|2018
|rowspan="1"|AFC Champions League
|rowspan="1"|Play-off round
| Al-Gharafa
| colspan=3; style="text-align:center;"|1–2
|-
|rowspan="5"|2019
|rowspan="5"|AFC Champions League
|rowspan="1"|Preliminary round 2
|  Al-Quwa Al-Jawiya
| colspan=3; style="text-align:center;"|2–1
|-
|rowspan="1"|Play-off round
| Al-Nasr
| colspan=3 style="text-align:center;"|2–1
|-
|rowspan="3"|Group stage
| Persepolis
| style="text-align:center;"|1–0
| style="text-align:center;"|1–1
| rowspan=3; style="text-align:center;"|3rd
|-
| Al Ahli
| style="text-align:center;"|1–0
| style="text-align:center;|1–2
|-
|  Al Sadd
| style="text-align:center;"|2–2
| style="text-align:center;"|1–2
|-
|rowspan="5"|2020
|rowspan="5"|AFC Champions League
|rowspan="3"|Group stage
|   Shabab Al-Ahli
| style="text-align:center;"|2–1
| style="text-align:center;"|0–0
| rowspan=3; style="text-align:center;"|1st
|-
|  Shahr Khodro
| style="text-align:center;"|3–0
| style="text-align:center;"|1–0
|-
|  Al-Hilal 
| style="text-align:center;"|0–0
| style="text-align:center;"|1–2
|-
|rowspan="1"|Round of 16
| Esteghlal
| colspan=3; style="text-align:center;"|2–1
|-
|rowspan="1"|Quarter-final
| Persepolis
| colspan=3; style="text-align:center;"|0–2
|-
|rowspan="3"|2021
|rowspan="3"|AFC Champions League
|rowspan="3"|Group stage
| Tractor
| style="text-align:center;"|3–3
| style="text-align:center;"|0–0
| rowspan=3; style="text-align:center;"|3rd
|-
| Al-Quwa Al-Jawiya
| style="text-align:center;"|1–0
| style="text-align:center;"|0–0
|-
| Sharjah
| style="text-align:center;"|1–1
| style="text-align:center;"|1–4
|-
|rowspan="3"|2022
|rowspan="3"|AFC Champions League
|rowspan="3"|Group stage
| Sepahan
| style="text-align:center;"|1–3
| style="text-align:center;"|1–2
| rowspan=3; style="text-align:center;"|4th
|-
| Al-Duhail
| style="text-align:center;"|0–3
| style="text-align:center;"|2–3
|-
| Al-Taawoun
| style="text-align:center;"|5–4
| style="text-align:center;"|1–0
|}

Rivalries
Since Bunyodkor's promotion to the Uzbek League, matches between club and their rival from capital - football powerhouse Pakhtakor - is being considered by supporters on both sides and football journalists too as the Uzbek capital derby or Toshkent derby''.

The match between Pakhtakor and Neftchi Farg'ona is one of the most popular rivalries in Uzbek League held since 1992. The first match between the two clubs was played on 25 May 1992 in Tashkent.

Stadium

Pakhtakor Markaziy Stadium was built in 1956 with a capacity of 55.000 spectators. The stadium was renovated in 1996, and in July 2007 club management announced the next renovation. Reconstruction work finished in 2009, the capacity was reduced to 35.000 and the stadium became an all-seater stadium. In January 2010, the stadium was chosen as the best sporting facility in 2009 of Uzbekistan.

In popular culture
The famous Uzbek singers Shahzoda, Rustam Gaipov, groups "Parvoz"(ex), "Quartet", "Bojalar" and "Ummon" dedicated their songs to Pakhtakor Football Club.

Players

Current squad

Out on loan

Personnel

Current technical staff

Management

Honours

Domestic
Uzbekistan Super League
Champions (15) (record): 1992, 1998, 2002, 2003, 2004, 2005, 2006, 2007, 2012, 2014, 2015, 2019, 2020, 2021, 2022

Uzbekistan Cup
Winners (13) (record): 1993, 1997, 2001, 2002, 2003, 2004, 2005, 2006, 2007, 2009, 2011, 2019, 2020
Runners-up: 1996, 2008, 2018, 2021

Uzbekistan Super Cup
Winners: (2) 2021, 2022
Runners-up: 1999, 2015, 2016

Uzbekistan League Cup
Winners: 2019

1972

Cup

International
CIS Cup
Winners: 2007
Runners-up: 2008

IFA Shield (IFA)
Winners: 1993

AFC Champions League
Semi-finalists: 2002–03, 2004

Managerial history

Notable players

Former players

Had international caps for their respective countries. Players whose name is listed in bold represented their countries while playing for Pakhtakor.

USSR/Uzbekistan

Former USSR countries

Europe

South America

Africa

Asia

Notes

References

External links

Official website 
Club statistics at KLISF

 
Association football clubs established in 1956
Sport in Tashkent
Pakhtakor Tashkent
1956 establishments in Uzbekistan
Soviet Top League clubs